Coatepec Municipality is a municipality in Puebla in south-eastern Mexico.

References 

Municipalities of Puebla